Murk / is a 2005 Danish horror and psychological thriller film. The film was directed by Jannik Johansen, who wrote the screenplay along with Anders Thomas Jensen. The film stars Nikolaj Lie Kaas and Nicolas Bro.

Plot 

Julie, a wheelchair-user, is said to have committed suicide on her wedding night. Her brother Jacob, who is a journalist, follows her ex-fiance to the Danish village of Mørke. Upon meeting him, Jacob discovers that he is going to marry another handicapped woman. Upon these revelations, Jacob investigates whether Julie's ex-fiance is murdering women who are handicapped.

Cast

Release 

The film was screened at the Edinburgh International Film Festival on 19 August 2005 and on 23 August 2005 at the Copenhagen International Film Festival. The film was released in Denmark on 7 October 2005.

Awards
Bodil Awards - 2006
 Nominated for Bodil award for Best Film (Bedste danske film)
 Nominated for Bodil for Best Supporting Actress (Bedste kvindelige birolle)

Robert Festival - 2006
 Nominated for a Robert award for Best Actor 
 Nominated for a Robert award for Best Cinematography 
 Nominated for a Robert award for Best Make-Up 
 Nominated for a Robert award for Best Sound 
 Nominated for a Robert award for Best Original Score

Remake 

Marcel Sarmiento and Gadi Harel directed the American adaptation of the film entitled Merciless. The Gold Circle Films project was rewritten in late December 2009 by Ed Dougherty and was released in 2011.

References

External links 
 

2005 films
2005 horror films
2000s thriller drama films
2005 psychological thriller films
2000s Danish-language films
Danish drama films
British thriller drama films
Danish thriller films
Films set in Denmark
2005 drama films
Films with screenplays by Anders Thomas Jensen
2000s British films